Saint-Jean-de-Braye is a commune in the Loiret department in north-central France. It is an eastern suburb of Orléans. The organist and musicologist Norbert Dufourcq (1904–1990) was born in the commune.

On 14 February 2020, the municipal council voted unanimously to suspend the twin towns partnership with the Polish Tuchów as a result of the controversial anti-LGBT resolution passed by the Tuchów authorities.

Population

See also
 Communes of the Loiret department

References

Saintjeandebraye